Kiltoraght is a civil parish in County Clare, Ireland.
It is just south of Kilfenora and is part of Catholic parish of Kilfenora.

Location

The land is mostly suitable for farming, either tillage or rich pasture. Lough Fergus lies on the western boundary of the parish.
The parish is crossed by the road from Kilfenora to Ennis.
The main hamlet in 1845 was Knockeighra.

Antiquities and History

The name of the patron saint of the parish is not found in the Irish Martyrologies. 
The old church in the townland of Knockroe is completely ruined. 
In 1580 there were two castles in the parish, at Inchovea and Kilmore, both the property of Teige MacMurrogh O’Brien.
The main antiquities surviving in 1845 were Knockaunacurra fort and the ruin of Inchovea castle.

The population in 1841 was 1,074 in 163 houses.
In 1845 the parish was united with the Catholic parish of Clooney.
Kiltoraght today is part of Catholic parish of Kilfenora in the Roman Catholic Diocese of Galway, Kilmacduagh and Kilfenora. It is served by the church of Saint Attracta, Kiltoraght.

Townlands

Townlands are Ballynacarhagh, Derrynaheilla, Drumeevin, Kilmore North, Kilmore South, Knockaneden, Knockroe and Toormore.

References
Citations

Sources

Civil parishes of County Clare